Frederick Edmund Meredith  (January 16, 1862 – September 23, 1941) was a Canadian lawyer and businessman. He was the 8th Chancellor of Bishop's University; President of the Mount Royal Club; Bâtonnier of the Bar of Montreal; President of the Montreal Victorias for three of their Stanley Cup championships in the late 1890s, and Chief Counsel to the CPR at the inquest into the sinking of RMS Empress of Ireland.

The F.E. Meredith Memorial Prize is a scholarship given to students graduating in an English program with the best written English at Bishop's University.

Early life

Born at Quebec City, F.E. Meredith was the youngest son of Chief Justice Sir William Collis Meredith of Quebec and his wife, Sophia Naters Holmes (1820–1898), grand-daughter of William Holmes. One of his godfathers was his father's first cousin, Sir Richard Graves MacDonnell, and the other was his uncle, Edmund Allen Meredith, for whom he was given his middle name. Edmund Meredith was also uncle and godfather to Sir Augustus Meredith Nanton, with whom Meredith would later sit with on the board of the Canadian Pacific Railway. Meredith's father was a first cousin of John Walsingham Cooke Meredith, the father of the Eight London Merediths who included among them Sir Vincent Meredith and Charles Meredith, both close friends and business associates. He was educated at Bishop's College School. Following a year in France, he returned to Canada to read law at Bishop's University (B.A., M.A.), and Université Laval (LL.B., LL.L., LL.M., LL.D.). He was called to the Bar of Quebec in 1884, commencing his career as a barrister specializing in corporate law in the firm of Abbott & Badgeley at Montreal.

Legal and Business Career
 
In 1898, Meredith and his two closest friends from Laval, Charles Sandwith Campbell and James Bryce Allan (1861–1945) K.C. (brother of his cousins wife, Lady Vincent Meredith), took over from the ageing Sir John Abbott and William Badgley to become the firm's new senior partners. Since the departure of his father from Montreal to Quebec City in 1849, the law firm of Abbott (who had articled under his father) and Badgley had become the most influential in the city, which was then the financial capital of Canada. The firm's major clients included Canadian Pacific Railway, the Bank of Montreal, the Hudson's Bay Company, the Allan Line, the Bank of British North America, Molson Bank, Dominion Textile, Hugh Allan's Merchant's Bank and the Ritz-Carlton Hotel. Campbell, Meredith & Allan continued the firm's dominance, acting as lawyers to the majority of the residents of the Golden Square Mile. Today the firm is known as Borden Ladner Gervais.

Created a Queen's Counsel in 1899, Meredith became Syndic of the Bar of Montreal in 1904/05; Councillor and Trustee of the Montreal Bar Association; Delegate of the Montreal Bar to the General Council of the Province, along with another close friend, Aime Geoffrion, 1906. In 1907, he was elected Bâtonnier of the Bar of Montreal, and in an address in this capacity before the Empire Club of Canada, he stressed the need for more justices in the Superior Court and declared his opposition to the proposed abolition of the Admiralty Court. He was the Solicitor to the Shipping Federation of Canada in the early 1900s, and represented his client company, the CPR, as their Chief Consul at the investigation into the sinking of the RMS Empress of Ireland, presided over by Lord Mersey. In 1930, Meredith and Sir Edward Beatty were received at the White House by President Herbert Hoover. Privy Council cases took him often to England, and he twice turned down offers to become a judge, preferring to maintain the business connections he held with many of his client companies.

His personal popularity, derived from graciousness of manner and sincerity of feeling, coupled with his intimate association with many of Canada's larger business concerns made him a desirable addition to the boards of a number of the country’s foremost corporations including: the Bank of Montreal; Royal Trust Company; Canadian Pacific Railway; Canadian Pacific Steamships; Standard Life of Edinburgh; Royal Securities Corporation; The National Steel Car Corporation; Canadian Cottons Ltd.; Lake Superior Corporation; National Liverpool Insurance Company (England); Montreal & General Investor Ltd.; The Banker's Trust Company and the Liverpool, London & Globe Insurance Company in England. When the National City Company of New York City had a subsidiary in Montreal, Meredith was chosen as a member of the advisory board.

Bishop's and Université Laval

His interest in various educational and cultural undertakings was well known, particularly in the progress and welfare of Bishops University, where he led the successful financial campaign of 1924. As an advocate to many of the country's largest corporations, along with his family connections and strength of character, Meredith wielded a very considerable influence in Quebec. In 1926, he succeeded his brother-in-law's first cousin, John Hamilton, becoming the 8th chancellor of Bishop's, a position he held until 1932. Principal Arthur McGreer later stated that all the substantial financial gifts from 1924 onwards had in some cases been entirely, and in most cases largely, due to Meredith. The F.E. Meredith Prize at Bishop’s was endowed after his death by his son, W.C.J. Meredith, awarded annually to the student with the best written English graduating from an English course. Fred Meredith also donated the Meredith Cup which is still competed for annually between the golfers of the college. In 1904, Université Laval conferred on him the degree of Doctor of Civil Law (D.C.L.) honoris causa. To commemorate the event, Meredith instituted a scholarship payable each year to the graduating student of the law faculty who obtained the highest marks. He and his two former business partners, Charles Sandwith Campbell and James Bryce Allan, also endowed the Prix Jette, awarded annually to the best student in civil law at their shared alma mater, Université Laval.

Family 

In 1903, Meredith married Anne Madeleine VanKoughnet (1863–1945), daughter of Mathew Robert VanKoughnet (1824–1874) of Toronto and Cornwall; Barrister and Bencher of the Law Society of Upper Canada. Her father practised law with his brother, The Hon. Philip Michael Matthew Scott VanKoughnet, later Chancellor of Upper Canada, and together they acquired the largest legal practice brought together in Upper Canada. Mrs Meredith's mother, Elizabeth Hagerman Macaulay (1826–1899), was a daughter of George Macaulay (1796-1828) of Bath, Upper Canada, and a niece of John Simcoe Macaulay, Sir James Buchanan Macaulay, Christopher Alexander Hagerman and John Solomon Cartwright. Mrs Meredith was the widow of Francis Wolferstan Thomas, by whom she had three children. From 1903, he lived at a house designed for him by Robert Findlay on Pine Avenue in Montreal's Golden Square Mile. He also variously kept rooms at the Ritz Carlton, Mount Royal Club and University Club. Meredith and his wife 'mutually consented to separate' in 1913, leaving one son, William Campbell James Meredith, who married the youngest daughter of Louis de Lotbiniere-Harwood.

Mrs. Meredith had served with Lady Vincent Meredith as a Governor of the Montreal Maternity Hospital. When she separated from her husband in 1913, she moved to England, living in Knightsbridge, London. During World War I she served with the Canadian Red Cross at the Moor Park Convalescent Home for Canadian Officers, in Devon. In 1942, Mrs. Meredith went to stay with her daughter Shearme and her husband, Lt.-Col. John Lionel Philips, at their home Abbey Cwmhir Hall. During her stay she fell ill and three years later she died there, July 27, 1945. A funeral service was held for her at Penybont, where there is a bench in the churchyard to her memory. She was survived by her four children and two of her sisters, Mrs. Frank Wolff May of Montreal and Lady Casimir Cartwright van Straubenzee of London.

Private life

Meredith had been a noted sportsman. Playing Rackets, he was a Dominion finalist on one occasion and frequently represented Canada in competitions against the United States. In 1897 he won the championship of the Montreal Rackets Club, and was the runner-up in 1898. As a young man he'd also played ice hockey, and he was elected the honorary president of the Montreal Victorias when they won the Stanley Cup in 1895, 1896 and 1897. He later sponsored an ice hockey team for the office boys in his firm, and amateur golf competitions. He raced with the old Montreal Jockey Club, took flying lessons in Winnipeg and fox hunted with relatives in England, Ireland, and with the Montreal Hunt. He played tennis into his seventies, notably in John Wilson McConnell's group, and at the Mount Royal Tennis Club. He was Chairman of the Montreal Shakespeare Club and a generous donator to Martha Allan's Montreal Repertory Theatre. At university he developed a keen interest in photography, and at one stage considered an apprenticeship with William Notman. He belonged to many sporting and social clubs in Montreal and served as President of three of them: the Mount Royal Club, the Montreal Racquet Club and the University Club. In England, he belonged to the St James's Club, Travellers Club, Marlborough and British Empire clubs.

Obituary

F.E. Meredith was well remembered for his dry sense of humour and was frequently described as "the most colourful and prominent figure" on the Bar of Montreal and "one of the most eminent personalities not only in the Quebec Bar but in the whole of Canada". Arnold Heeney especially recalled the generosity of F.E. Meredith, "that grand old dandy... who would quite often have me home with him for lunch, and test me with the largest, strongest martinis I had ever known". Horst Oertel wrote An Appreciation to his friend that was published in The Times of London in 1941,

Meredith died shortly before his eightieth birthday (‘birthdays are not the kind of thing one wants to commemorate’ he once said), after an illness of several weeks. He died at his home on Pine Avenue in the Golden Square Mile shortly after eleven o’clock of that morning, predominantly of old age. Meredith's funeral was one of the largest ever seen in Montreal, and out of respect the practice division of the courts were closed for the day. The city's legal and business communities turned out in full force, and both were represented among his pall-bearers who included Sir Edward Beatty, Sir Montagu Allan, Sir Herbert Holt and Chief Justice R.A.E. Greenshields. He was buried in the Meredith plot at Mount Royal Cemetery, Montreal, next to his cousins, Sir Vincent Meredith and Charles Meredith and their respective wives.

See also 
List of Bishop's College School alumni

References

Further reading
The History of McMaster Meighen

Associated Articles 
 Election to the Directorate of the Bank of Montreal, 1923
 Bishop's Convocation Speeches, Montreal Gazette, May 21, 1929
 Bishop's College Closing Ceremony is Notable Event, Montreal Gazette, June 17, 1932
 Hundreds at Rites for F.E. Meredith, Montreal Gazette, September 26, 1941
 Seeing God The Banker Worth 35 Bucks to Him, Ottawa Citizen, November 25, 1953
Mr Corderre is Again Syndic, 1908
 English-Canadian Leadership Has Faded Since '50s, Montreal Gazette, April 1, 1976
 The Libel Suit of George of Wales Comes to Trial: Eminent Counsel Engaged in the Effort to Punish the Montreal Correspondent who sent out Dispatches about the Prince (1891)
 Jockey Club Bill, 1909
 Honored by Bishop's University, Montreal Gazette, June 21, 1930
 Female Heroism, The Quebec Daily Telegraph, August 29, 1885
 Accident to Quebecers - Two of Sir Wm. Meredith's Sons Injured By A Runaway, The Quebec Saturday Budget, August 28, 1886
 McGill University Archives, Montreal

Photographs
 F.E. Meredith presents Mayor Médéric Martin of Montreal with a key to one of the new Campbell Parks, 1926
 F.E. Meredith (1862-1941), 1894
 One of Meredith's early photographs, showing his father at his desk at home, c.1890
 Meredith in fancy dress for the Castanet Club Ball, 1886
 Frederick E. Meredith dressed as Napoleon, 1897
 Portrait of Frederick Edmund Meredith, Chancellor of Bishop's University
 Meredith (centre right) with the Stanley Cup winning Montreal Victorias, 1894-95
 Meredith (centre right) with the Stanley Cup winning Montreal Victorias, 1895-96
 Meredith (seated centre) with the Stanley Cup winning Montreal Victorias, 1896-97
 Meredith, Batonnier of the Montreal Bar, 1907

1862 births
1941 deaths
Canadian lawyers
Lawyers from Montreal
Businesspeople from Quebec
Université Laval alumni
Bishop's University alumni
Canadian King's Counsel
Burials at Mount Royal Cemetery
Bishop's College School alumni